Pavel Pavlovich Alikin (born 6 March 1984) is a Russian professional footballer. He plays as a centre-back for FC Rodina Moscow.

Club career
He made his debut in the Russian Premier League in 2005 for FC Amkar Perm.

After 10 seasons with FC Ufa, on 14 July 2021 he signed with FC Rodina Moscow.

Career statistics

Club

Notes

Honours
 Russian Cup finalist: 2008 (played in the early stages of the 2007/08 tournament for FC Amkar Perm.

References

1984 births
Sportspeople from Perm, Russia
Living people
Russian footballers
Association football defenders
FC Amkar Perm players
FC Salyut Belgorod players
FC Chita players
FC SKA-Khabarovsk players
FC Ufa players
Russian Premier League players
Russian First League players
Russian Second League players